This is a list of rural localities in Chelyabinsk Oblast. Chelyabinsk Oblast (Chelyabinskaya oblast) is a federal subject (an oblast) of Russia in the Ural Mountains region, on the border of Europe and Asia. Its administrative center is the city of Chelyabinsk. Population: 3,476,217 (2010 Census).

Locations 
 Abdrakhmanova
 Abdulka
 Abdyrova
 Ablyazovo
 Agapovka
 Argayash
 Bredy
 Chesma
 Dolgoderevenskoye
 Fershampenuaz
 Kizilskoye
 Krasnokamenka
 Kunashak
 Miasskoye
 Oktyabrskoye
 Parizh
 Uvelsky
 Uyskoye
 Yeleninka
 Yetkul

See also 
 
 Lists of rural localities in Russia

References 

Chelyabinsk Oblast